Jonás Fernández Álvarez (born 1979) is a Spanish economist and politician who has been serving as Member of the European Parliament since 2014.

Early life and education 
Born on 8 January 1979 in Oviedo, Fernández earned a licentiate degree in Economics at the University of Oviedo (1997–2001). He later obtained an M.A. in Economics and Finance from CEMFI-Bank of Spain (2002–2004) and an Executive MBA from IESE Business School (2010–2012).

Career
Fernández was Secretary-General of the Socialist Youth of Oviedo.

Fernández worked for Madrid-based consulting firm Solchaga Recio & asociados (2005–2014) and lectured at the Charles III University of Madrid (2007–2010).

Fernández was included in the 14th position of the Spanish Socialist Workers' Party (PSOE) list for the 2014 European Parliament election in Spain, becoming a member of the European Parliament. He ran again for the 2019 European Parliament election in Spain, 16th in the PSOE list, retaining his seat.

As a member  of the Progressive Alliance of Socialists and Democrats (S&D) political group, Fernández has since been serving on the Committee on Economic and Monetary Affairs (ECON). In 2020, he also joined the Subcommittee on Tax Matters. In addition to his committee assignments, he is part of the Spinelli Group and the European Parliament Intergroup on Trade Unions. 

In July 2019, the S&D group in the European Parliament elected Fernández as the group's spokesperson (coordinator) in the ECON Committee. In this capacity, he is also the parliament's rapporteur on measures to ease capital and accounting burdens on banks to ensure a continued flow of loans to businesses struggling in the COVID-19 pandemic in 2020.

Works

References

Living people
MEPs for Spain 2014–2019
MEPs for Spain 2019–2024
Spanish Socialist Workers' Party MEPs
1979 births